Animal Skull, also known as Lizard Head, Animal Skull II and Ete II (before 562 – ), was an ajaw of the Maya city of Tikal. He took the throne after 562, reigning until . He was a son of Fire Cross and Lady Hand Sky of Bahlam.

Notes

Footnotes

References

Year of death unknown
Rulers of Tikal
6th century in the Maya civilization
6th-century monarchs in North America
Year of birth unknown